Fyodor Sergeyevich Bondarchuk (born 9 May 1967) is a Russian film director, actor, TV and film producer, clipmaker, TV host, founder of production company Art Pictures Studio.

Specializes in action, war, and science fiction films. Some of his most notable films include The 9th Company (2005), The Inhabited Island (2008–2009), Stalingrad (2013) and Attraction (2017).

As an actor, Bondarchuk is best known for starring in 8 ½ $ (1999), Down House (2001), Two Days (2011), The PyraMMMid (2011) and Ghost (2015).

Is a winner of TEFI award in 2003 in nomination “The best host of the entertainment TV-show”. He is a two-time winner of the Golden Eagle Award: as a Best Actor in a movie Two Days by Avdotya Smirnova (2011) and as a Best Actor in the comedy Ghost produced by Alexander Voitinsky (2015).

On 15 October 2012 he was appointed as Chairman of Lenfilm's Board of directors.

Early life 

Fyodor was born on 9 May 1967 in Moscow, his mother actress Irina Skobtseva and his father director Sergei Bondarchuk.

In 1992 he graduated as a film director from the Gerasimov Institute of Cinematography, in the class of Yuri Ozerov.

Career 

His acting debut was with his father in 1986 in the film Boris Godunov (1986). Sergei Bondarchuk was also the director of the movie. 

In 1990 started his career as the first Russian producer of music videos. In 1993 he won the Ovation award as the best producer of musical video.

Bondarchuk's breakthrough as an actor came with his dual role in the 1999 cult film 8 ½ $ by Grigori Konstantinopolsky, where he played both Fyodor and Stepan. In 2001 Fyodor played the role of Count Myshkin in Down House, loosely based on Dostoyevsky's novel The Idiot.

Fyodor Bondarchuk started his career as a film producer in 2002, beginning with the film In Motion (2002). Since that he has produced over twenty film projects that were great box-office successes. Bondarchuk won the 2003 TEFI Award for "the Best Host of the Entertainment TV-Show". In 2005 he directed his debut film The 9th Company, which was based on real events which happened during the Afghan war (1979–1989). The filming process took place in the Crimea, and lasted 5 months. The 9th Company eventually won 7 awards and was nominated eight times. It also broke the former box office record. The 9th Company became the first Russian film earning $25 million. In 2006 The 9th Company was submitted for Best Foreign Film on Academy Award, but it was ultimately not nominated.

Also Fyodor created The Inhabited Island (2008). In 2006 Boris Strugatskiy gave him the rights to adapt the fantasy novel Prisoners of Power. The overall time of the shooting took 222 days. Production and distribution of Inhabited Island was realized by Fyodor Bondarchuk's film company Art Pictures Studio. The film earned $30 million and took the third place of the box office of CIS area in 2009. In 2012 Bondarchuk received the Golden Eagle Award for the Best Actor in the film Two Days (2011) by Avdotya Smirnova. At the same year, Fyodor and film producer Alexander Rodnyansky officially announced the beginning of the cooperation with IMAX Filmed Entertainment (also known as IMAX Corporation).

Greg Foster, the president of the company, said: 

As a result, their project Stalingrad was the first Russian film shown in IMAX format. It was released in October 2013.

In 2017 Fedor Bondarchuk directed the science fiction film Attraction. It was a box office success and earned $18 million. Over 4 million viewers watched Attraction in cinema, and it was the leader of online streaming after the digital release. The follow-up of this story, the film Invasion, came out in theaters in January 2020 and grossed over $11.5 millions in cinemas (with more than 2 million audience). Fedor Bondarchuk’s most recent project is his first TV-series Psycho — a dramatic story about a modern psychotherapist with Konstantin Bogomolov and Elena Lyadova in leading roles. Psycho was released on more.tv streaming service on 5 November. Russian NMG Studio and Renta Videostudio are producing.

Other roles

Bondarchuk is chair of the board of trustees of the Kinotavr Film Festival, a member of the Russian Academy of Cinema Arts and Science (responsible for the Nika Awards) and a member of the National Academy of Motion Pictures Arts and Sciences of Russia (responsible for the Golden Eagle Awards.

Business

Art Pictures Studio 
Fyodor is a founder of Art Pictures Studio production company, which he founded in 1991 together with his friends Juhan Saul Gross and Stepan Mikhalkov and reorganized it into the Art Pictures Studio in 2006 with his partner Dmitry Rudovskiy. The main area of the company is film and video production and distribution. The company is working with a variety of projects, ranging from music and advertising videos to feature films.

Musical and advertising videos made by Art Pictures received a lot of Russian and international awards. The company worked with Heinz, Philips, Sony, Zikr (Colgate total), Pepsi etc. In 2002 Art Pictures moved into film production.

In 2012 Fyodor Bondarchuk produced the screen adaption of Sergey Minaev's book of the same name, Dukhless. Released in October 2012, it became the most successful Russian fiction film that year. The sequel, Dukhless 2, was released in 2015.

In 2018 he produced another Minaev adaptation, Selfie, and the box-office hit musical film Ice which grossed $22 million against the budget of $2 million.

Among the most famous Art Picture Studio’s film projects are the dilogy Soulles (2012) and Soulles 2 (2015) (both features were based on Sergey Minaev's books of the same name). The first picture of this series became the most successful Russian fiction film in 2012. The sequel Soulles 2 grossed more than $8 million. In 2018 Fedor Bondarchuk produced another Minaev’s adaptation Selfie (grossed more than $4 million). In 2018 APS also released a musical film Ice that became a box-office hit and grossed more than $22 million against the budget of $2 million. Its sequel Ice 2 (2020) was released in February and grossed more than $21 million.

One of the latest Studio’s projects, sci-fi thriller Sputnik (2020). In Russia the picture was digitally released in April and was viewed more than 1 million times after just one month of streaming. After its release in the USA Sputnik also became Number 1 in American iTunes (the "Horror" category) and made it to the service’s top-5 in general. Sputnik's Rotten Tomatoes score is almost 90%, the first Russian project to be rated this highly. APS is also developing its first documentary focusing on a figure of Academy-Award winning director Sergei Bondarchuk. Helming the project are journalists Denis Kataev and Anton Jelnov with Ilya Belov as a director.

Art Pictures Studio also has a subdivision Art Pictures Vision that specializes in TV production. This company’s portfolio includes such hits as The Year of Culture (TNT channel), 90's. Funny and loud!, Psychologirls (STS channel). In 2019 other Vision’s projects were digitally released on Amazon Prime streaming service: sports drama Junior League (STS), spy thriller Sleepers (TV 1st channel) and a horror story The day after.  Among current popular Art Pictures Vision projects are a road-movie type of comedy Let's go!(STS) and sports comedy Lanky Girls (STS). Among new releases are — a detective period piece An Hour before the Dawn (post-production) and story about a Russian moto sport team Kamaz Master — Truck Racer (post-production).

Glavkino 
In 2008 Fyodor Bondarchuk together with Konstantin Ernst (Director General of the Russian Channel One) and Ilya Bachurin founded the large-scale project Glavkino. The project consists of a television and television complex, a hardware complex, a production center, a script laboratory. In 2011 Glavkino and New York Art Academy founded a grant named after Sergei Bondarchuk.

In 2017 Glavkino ownership was transferred from its founders, including Fyodor Bondarchuk, Konstantin Ernst, Ilya Bachurin, Vitaly Golovachev and Nikolai Tsvetkov, to the creditor VTB Bank. Each of the five founders of Glavkino received $1800 each, while VTB repaid the studio's debts, estimated at about $52 million.

Kinositi 
In 2009 Fyodor Bondarchuk with producer Sergey Selianov initiated the project Kinositi. The main mission of this company is to create network of multimedia educational cinema complexes throughout Russia. In 2012, Kinositi became the official partner of cinema chain Premier Zal.

Restaurant business 
Fyodor Bondarchuk is a co-owner of two restaurants in Moscow (together with his friends and partners Stepan Mikhalkov, Arkadiy Novikov and Kirill Gusev).

Television 
Fyodor Bondarchuk is a popular television host in Russia. His show about the world of cinema aired weekly on the STS TV channel in Russia. His guests in the studio included Oliver Stone, Darren Aronofsky, Michael Bay, Christoph Waltz, Daniel Craig, Til Schweiger etc.
In 2003 he received TEFI as the best TV host of entertainment program, in March 2004 Bondarchuk became a member of Russian Television Academy's fund. At the same year Fyodor started to host the reality show You are a Supermodel.

In 2013 Fyodor started his career as a TV producer with two projects on the STS channel in Russia.

Political activism 
In March 2014, he signed a letter in support of the position of the President of Russia Vladimir Putin on Russia's military intervention in Ukraine.

Filmography

Actor

Director

Producer

Awards and nominations

Awards 
 Sozvezdie 2002 – Best Supporting Actor (Kino pro kino)
 TEFI, 2003 – Best TV host of entertainment TV show  (Kreslo, STS)
 Nika Award, 2006 – Best Feature Film (The 9th Company, director Fedor Bondarchuk)
 Golden Eagle Award, 2006 – Best Feature Film (The 9th Company, director Fedor Bondarchuk)
 Golden Aries Award (Russia), 2006 – Best Film (The 9th Company, director Fedor Bondarchuk)
 Golden Aries Award (Russia), 2006 – Best directing debut (The 9th Company, director Fedor Bondarchuk)
 Golden Aries Award (Russia), 2006 – People's choice Award (The 9th Company, director Fedor Bondarchuk)
 Golden Aries Award (Russia), 2006 – Best feature film according to Internet voting (The 9th Company, director Fedor Bondarchuk)
 VIVAT (Russia), 2006 – Grand Prix of the festival (The 9th Company, director Fedor Bondarchuk)
 Blockbaster 2009 (Box office record on CIS area) (The Inhabited Island, director Fedor Bondarchuk)
 International Antalya Golden Orange Film Festival (Turkey), 2010 – special prize for the contribution to the world cinema
 Golden Eagle Award, 2012 – Golden Eagle Award for Best Leading Actor (Two Days, director Dunya Smirnova)

Nominations 
 Nika Award, 2003 – Best Supporting Actor (Kino pro kino)
 Nika Award, 2006 – Breakthrough of the Year (The 9th Company, director Fedor Bondarchuk)
 Nika Award, 2006 – Best Director (The 9th Company, director Fedor Bondarchuk)
 Golden Eagle Award, 2006 – Best Feature Film (The 9th Company, director Fedor Bondarchuk)
 Golden Eagle Award, 2008 – Golden Eagle Award for Best Leading Actor (Tiski)
 Golden Eagle Award, 2012 – Golden Eagle Award for Best Leading Actor (Spy)
 MTV Russia Movie Awards, 2008 – Best Actor (Ya ostayus)
 MTV Russia Movie Awards, 2008 – Best Movie villain (Tiski)

Personal life 
Fyodor was married for more than 20 years to Svetlana Bondarchuk (née Rudskaya), main editor of HELLO! magazine (Russia). They have 2 children: son Sergey and daughter Varvara. After divorcing from Svetlana, Fedor became romantically involved with actress Paulina Andreeva.

References

External links 
 
 Fedor Bondarchuk full Bio
 The official channel youtube

1967 births
Living people
Russian people of Ukrainian descent
Fedor
Soviet male actors
Russian film directors
Russian film producers
Russian game show hosts
Russian male film actors
Russian male television actors
Russian male voice actors
20th-century Russian male actors
21st-century Russian male actors
Male actors from Moscow
Russian television presenters
Russian restaurateurs
Gerasimov Institute of Cinematography alumni
Members of the Civic Chamber of the Russian Federation
Academicians of the National Academy of Motion Picture Arts and Sciences of Russia
Russian music video directors
Sergei Bondarchuk